Eupithecia petersi is a moth in the family Geometridae. It was described by David Stephen Fletcher in 1956. It is found in Tanzania.

References

Moths described in 1956
petersi
Moths of Africa